Hormizd (sometimes spelled Hormuzd and Graecized Hormisdas or Ormisdas) is an Iranian name derived from the name of the god Ahura Mazda. It may refer to:

Any of the several kings and members of the Sasanian dynasty of Persia:
Hormizd I (272–273), Sasanian king
Hormizd II (302–310), Sasanian king
Hormizd III (457–459), Sasanian king
Hormizd IV (579–590), Sasanian king
Hormizd V (593), Sasanian king
Hormizd VI (631–632), Sasanian king
Hormizd (son of Hormizd II), defected and fled to Constantinople
Hormizd of Sakastan, Sasanian prince
Hormizd I Kushanshah (270–295), ruler of the east of the Sasanian empire
Hormizd II Kushanshah (295–300), ruler of the east of the Sasanian empire

Other people with the name Hormizd or Hormisdas:
Pope Hormisdas (450–523), saint
Hormizd the Martyr (d. c. 420), saint
Rabban Hormizd, 7th century Assyrian saint
Yohannan Hormizd (1760–1838), Patriarch of the Chaldean Catholic Church
Hormuzd Rassam (1826–1910), Assyrian assyriologist 
Hormazd Narielwalla (born 1979), Indian-born collage artist
Naval Hormusji Tata (1904–1989), Indian businessman
Sam Hormusji Framji Jamshedji Manekshaw (1914–2008), Field Marshal of the Indian Army

Other uses:
Rabban Hormizd Monastery, an ancient monastery in Iraq
Mar Hormiz Syro-Malabar Catholic Church, Angamaly
Boukoleon Palace in Constantinople, sometimes called the Hormisdas Palace after the son of Hormizd II

See also
 Hormuz (disambiguation)
 Hurmuz (disambiguation)